Flávio Almeida da Fonseca (born July 9, 1944, in Porto Alegre), best known as Flávio Minuano, is a former Brazilian footballer.

Flávio played for Fluminense, Internacional and Santos in the Campeonato Brasileiro.

Career 
Internacional: 1961 - 1964
Corinthians: 1964 - 1969
Fluminense: 1969 - 1971
Porto: 1972 - 1975
Internacional: 1975 - 1976
Santos: 1977
Pelotas: 1977 - 1978
Brasília: 1979
Jorge Wilstermann: 1980

Career statistics

Club

Team awards 
Rio Grande do Sul State Championship - 1961, 1975 and 1976 - Internacional
Rio de Janeiro State Championship - 1969 and 1971 - Fluminense
Campeonato Brasileiro Série A: 1970 - Fluminense, 1975 and 1976 - Internacional

References

External links 
 
 

1944 births
Sportspeople from Rio Grande do Sul
Living people
Brazilian footballers
Sport Club Corinthians Paulista players
Sport Club Internacional players
Fluminense FC players
FC Porto players
Santos FC players
C.D. Jorge Wilstermann players
Expatriate footballers in Bolivia
Association football forwards